Ársæll Örn Kjartansson (born 6 October 1945) is an Icelandic former footballer who played as a defender. He won three caps for the Iceland national football team between 1966 and 1968.

References

1945 births
Living people
Arsaell Kjartansson
Association football defenders
Arsaell Kjartansson
Arsaell Kjartansson